The list of damaged cultural sites during the 2022 Russian invasion of Ukraine is a list of cultural sites in Ukraine that have been verified by United Nations Educational, Scientific and Cultural Organization (UNESCO) as damaged and/or destroyed during the 2022 Russian invasion of Ukraine (that started on 24 February 2022).

Both Ukraine and Russia have signed the Hague Convention for the Protection of Cultural Property in the Event of Armed Conflict (the 1954 Hague Convention), which was drafted to safeguard cultural heritage during periods of armed conflicts.  UNESCO is primarily responsible for the dissemination and monitoring of compliance.

List
The list is current as of 29 August 2022 and based on information verified by UNESCO.

This includes 183 sites in total:

 78 religious sites
 13 museums
 35 historic buildings
 31 buildings dedicated to cultural activities
 17 monuments
 9 libraries

References

See also
 Ukrainian cultural heritage during the 2022 Russian invasion

Cultural heritage of Ukraine

War crimes during the 2022 Russian invasion of Ukraine